Naila is a 1965 Pakistani musical romance drama film, directed by Sharif Nayyar who also wrote the screenplay. The film is based on the novel of the same name by Razia Butt. It stars Shamim Ara in the titular role with Santosh Kumar and Darpan in substantial roles. The film revolves around Naila, who loves her fiancé Zafar, but Zafar's brother falls for her.

The film was released on 29 October 1965. The music of the film was composed by Inayat Hussain. The film became popular due to its song "Gham-e-dil ko, in ankhon se, chhalak jana bhi aata hai" which was performed by Mala. The film was also screened at Lok Virsa Museum of Pakistan in 2016.

Naila was a box office success being a golden jubilee hit and had a record theatrical run in Peshawar. At 1965 Nigar Awards, the film received eight trophies; including Best film, Best director, Best playback female singer for Mala and Best actress for Shamim Ara.

Plot 
Naila is busy in the arrangements of the family gatherings at her aunt's house. The gathering is held due to her cousins Zafar (also her fiancé) and Akhtar. She loves Zafar and vice versa. On arrival, Akhtar becomes free with her, makes jokes and laughs as he used to do in his childhood. Naila wants to spend time with Zafar but every time either it couldn't happen or Akhtar comes. Several events take place that confuse both of them that either she/he loves him/her or not. Naila's friend Simki who often visits Naila, confesses her love for Zafar to which he denies and Akhatr sees it. He asks her if she likes him and tries to do assault her but Zafar reaches there, slapped by Akhtar but saves Simki.

Later, one day Akhtar and Naila go for horse riding where Akhtar tells her that he loves to spend time with her and he is in love with her. Naila rejects him, goes back and confines herself in a room as she had injured herself by falling from the horse. There, Akhtar comes again to tell her that he loves her. He then tells it to her mother that he wants to marry Naila, who gets worried about the fate of her sons. She wants to do justice with them but Akhtar's love wins and she decides to marry him with Naila as Zafar is her stepson.

Cast 
 Shamim Ara as Naila
 Santosh Kumar as Zafar
 Darpan as Akhtar
 Ragni as Zafar and Akhtar's mother
 A. Shah
 Gul Rukh
 Saqi
 Husna
 Kumar

Soundtrack

Release and reception 
The film released on 29 October 1965 and was a super hit at the box office. It had theatrical run of 51 weeks in Karachi cinema with a Golden Jubilee hit. The film ran for record three years in Zafar Firdos cinema, a local cinema in Peshawar. Lok Virsa Museum screened the film in 2016 to retain the classical cinema from Rawalpindi, where the film was shot.

The film was selected among the "Top ten films" of the Pakistani cinema by the critic Aijaz Gul for the book "Asian Film Journeys: Selection from Cinemaya".

Awards and nominations

References

External links 
 

1965 films
1960s Urdu-language films
1965 romantic drama films
1960s romantic musical films
Films based on novels
Urdu-language Pakistani films
Pakistani musical films
Films shot in Pakistan
Nigar Award winners